Men vs. Women is a 2010 Italian comedy film directed by Fausto Brizzi.

A sequel entitled Women vs. Men (Femmine contro maschi) was released in February 2011.

Cast

References

External links

2010 films
Films directed by Fausto Brizzi
Films produced by Fulvio Lucisano
Films scored by Bruno Zambrini
2010s Italian-language films
2010 comedy films
Italian comedy films
2010s Italian films